The Division of Wills is an Australian electoral division of Victoria. It is currently represented by Peter Khalil of the Australian Labor Party.

The electorate encompasses many of the suburbs in the City of Moreland in Melbourne's north, including Brunswick, Coburg, Pascoe Vale, Fawkner, Glenroy and Essendon Airport.

Geography
Since 1984, federal electoral division boundaries in Australia have been determined at redistributions by a redistribution committee appointed by the Australian Electoral Commission. Redistributions occur for the boundaries of divisions in a particular state, and they occur every seven years, or sooner if a state's representation entitlement changes or when divisions of a state are malapportioned.

History

The division was named after William John Wills of Burke and Wills fame. It was created in the 1949 redistribution.

Wills has been in Labor hands for its entire existence except between the 1992 by-election and 1996, when it was held by independent Phil Cleary. Its highest-profile member was Bob Hawke, who was Prime Minister of Australia from 1983 until 1991. The 1992 by-election is remarkable for a number of reasons: It was caused by Bob Hawke's retirement from parliament; it had a record twenty-two candidates standing; it was won by an independent; the results were thrown out as the winner, Phil Cleary, was on unpaid leave from the state education system (the Australian Constitution forbids people employed by the Crown from standing for election). No replacement by-election was held as the court decision which threw out the results was made shortly before a general election was due.

While Wills remains a traditional Labor stronghold, demographic changes and the rise of The Greens has seen Wills, along with the neighbouring seat of Cooper, become Labor-Green contests in recent years. In 2016, Labor's margin versus Greens candidate and City of Moreland Mayor Samantha Ratnam dropped below 5 percent after a swing of more than 10 percent to Ratnam, despite the traditional 2PP margin (versus The Liberals) of over 20 percent making it one of the safest Labor seats in the country when considered against the Coalition. Labor's margin over the Greens increased to over 8 percent at the 2019 election, and remained almost unchanged at the 2022 Election.

Demographics 
Wills has undergone inner-city gentrification, particularly in Brunswick. This has led to a surge in support for the Greens. The Labor vote increases the further you move away from the Green heartland of Brunswick.

Wills has relatively large immigrant communities, with populations of second-generation Greek and Italian immigrants. According to the 2016 census, 47.8% of electors had both parents born outside of Australia. 

As of 2016, 7.7% of electors spoke Italian, 4.7% Arabic, and 4.5% Greek at home.

Members

Election results

References

External links
 Division of Wills - Australian Electoral Commission

Electoral divisions of Australia
Constituencies established in 1949
1949 establishments in Australia
City of Merri-bek
Electoral districts and divisions of Greater Melbourne